Bryn railway station is a railway station serving the suburb of Bryn in Ashton-in-Makerfield, Greater Manchester, England. The station, and all trains serving it, are operated by Northern Trains.

Facilities
The station is the only unstaffed one on the Huyton-to-Wigan line, being outside the Merseytravel area (but within that of Transport for Greater Manchester). Ticket machines have recently been installed on both platforms. The old station buildings shown in the caption have since been demolished and were replaced by basic waiting shelters. Digital display screens and timetable poster boards on each side provide train running information. Step-free access is provided only on the Wigan-bound platform.

Services 
Monday to Saturday daytimes, there is a half-hourly service to  northbound and Liverpool Lime Street southbound. Evenings there is an hourly service in each direction.

From 10 December 2017 there has been an hourly service on Sundays, to  northbound and Liverpool Lime Street southbound for the first time in many years.

History 

The line beyond Wigan was closed to passengers in January 1960 and completely in 1971.

Electrification
The Liverpool-to-Manchester line electrification also encompasses the entire Liverpool-to-Wigan route. This allows electric trains to operate from Bryn to Liverpool, St Helens and Wigan. Electrification was completed in May 2015.

References

External links 

Railway stations in the Metropolitan Borough of Wigan
DfT Category F1 stations
Former London and North Western Railway stations
Northern franchise railway stations
Railway stations in Great Britain opened in 1869
Ashton-in-Makerfield